Baceno (Lombard Bascén, Walser German: Aager) is a comune (municipality) in the Province of Verbano-Cusio-Ossola in the Italian region Piedmont, located about  northeast of Turin and about  northwest of Verbania, on the border with Switzerland.

Baceno borders the following municipalities: Binn (Switzerland), Crodo, Formazza, Grengiols (Switzerland), Premia, Varzo.

References

External links
 Official website

Cities and towns in Piedmont